Baltasar Brum Rodríguez, GCTE (18 June 1883 – 31 March 1933) was a Uruguayan political figure. He was President of Uruguay from 1919 to 1923.

Background
His political convictions closely followed those of liberal President José Batlle y Ordóñez, under whom Brum served as Education Minister 1913–1915. He was Interior Minister from 1915 to 1916.

Foreign Minister of Uruguay
Brum subsequently served as Foreign Minister under the Presidency of Feliciano Viera; in the latter capacity, Brum was noted for promoting good relations with the United States, which had joined World War I against Germany in 1917.

Brum's period of office as Foreign Minister proved to be somewhat controversial. In the autumn of 1917, American warships sailed to the Argentine capital Buenos Aires and a delegation issued threats to the country's President Hipólito Yrigoyen, in relation to the country's neutrality, which the United States insisted should be more clearly focused as being pro-American. Yrigoyen refused to be bowed by such threats from a military delegation, whereupon the American ships sailed to Montevideo, where they were warmly welcomed by Brum, in contrast to the guarded reception which the delegation had received in Buenos Aires. Brum later travelled to the United States and was received by the Secretary of State.

President of Uruguay
Brum thus came to presidential office in 1919 as one with a reputation as a pro-American facilitator of U.S. interests.

During Brum's presidency, he was noted for pursuing economic stability, but on the political front faced significant opposition from both his own Colorado Party, and notably from Luis Alberto de Herrera of the Blanco, or National, Party.  The dislike of each other by the two men was strong enough that President Brum actually challenged Herrera to a duel with pistols (legal in Uruguay at the time), which was fought near Montevideo on 14 December 1922, in front of several hundred government officials.  Though each man fired two shots and the other from a distance of 25 paces, neither was struck by a bullet.

Despite political rivalries, several reforms were realized under President Brum. Various laws were passed by the General Assembly "to contemplate the situation of the tenants punished by the great crisis." A law of 1921 "was in charge of regulating the rental of urban dwellings in the city of Montevideo and in the towns of the country departments." The rent couldn't be raised during the three-year period, and the type for setting the maximum rent was adopted as the one existing on 31 December 1919. A Rent Commission was established in the capital, consisting of three members appointed by the National Administration Council, the High Court of Justice and the Departmental Council of Montevideo, and in the campaign departments "Commissions made up of officials dependent on those same high authorities." The Rental Commissions would resolve "in an unappealable manner all the issues initiated by both the owners and the tenants." Under a 1919 law, the B.H.U. "authorized loans to build houses in industrial neighborhoods." In addition, a law of 27 May 1920 "authorized the CNA to project a plan of economic constructions destined to 'provide cheap rooms to the most needy classes.'" The Assembly was asked for a supplementary credit of $50,000 to go to the aid of the working population of Cerro, "who lacked work in the refrigerators and who were struggling in misery." The subsidy was raised successively to $100,000 and $150,000 "as a means of providing food for all the inhabitants of the country without means of subsistence." The task was then give to Public Assistance to provide food to the unemployed. A law of the General Assembly authorized the National Administration Council "to gradually apply the agrarian pledge law in force since 1918." In use of it, the National Council created within the National Inspection of Livestock and Agriculture a section of "Economy and Rural Credit" that was intended "for the promotion of agricultural credit and the registration of pledge contracts." An Act of 1921 provided for the protection of factory workers. A Decree of 2 October 1922 acted as a guide "in determining which foods are to be considered fit or unfit for human consumption." A Decree of 18 October 1920 included messengers in the Law of eight hours. A law of 10 December 1923 made 24 hours of rest compulsory "after six days of labour or every six days if the system of rest in rotation were adopted." Domestic servants were also covered, "with a special act of 19 November 1920 providing for this group and chauffeurs." Under a law of 15 February 1923 the benefits of a weekly rest were extended to rural labourers "although it was already common practice in the interior." In 1922, the Mortgage Bank was authorized to grant loans on land intended for agriculture, up to 15% of each series of mortgage securities, while loans could reach up to 85% of the value of each farm. A 1922 law decreed various measures aimed at guaranteeing the physical integrity of workers, with entrepreneurs of industrial establishments or of any type of works obliged to adopt the precautions determined by the same law, to reduce the possible job hazards.

A law of 22 October 1919 repealed a 10% tax on salaries of persons "connected with the military service, including those in the active service, those who have retired, and those on the pension list." 
 With the government's approval, on 30 December 1919 the Banco de Seguros del Estado started the building of workmen's houses in Montevideo. A gynaecology clinic and polyclinic for the treatment of children was established in the military hospital. A school budget passed in 1920 provided for increased salaries for teachers and an increase of teaching personnel and schools. In addition "Funds are also set aside for the aid of already existing commissions, which provide milk and clothes for needy children." An aviation pension law, which was promulgated on 29 October 1919, provided pension rights to dependents and relatives in case of death of military aviators and pilots, as well as members of the Military Aviation School, from aviation accidents while on duty. A presidential decree of 21 April 1920 "authorized the founding of dental clinics in the military hospital and in the naval school to care for the teeth of the students and the personnel of the armed forces." An executive decree of 18 June 1920 "orders the establishment of an economic and rural credit section for the registration of agricultural mortgages and the encouragement of agricultural loans."

In 1920, the licenses and attendance of employees of public offices dependent on the National Administration Council were regulated, under which all employees were granted an annual leave of 20 days of annual leave with pay, "an excellent provision for the double point of view of rest and the rotation of officials in the same job, as a means of correcting deficiencies and tending to the improvement of the services." In 1922, Public Assistance opened the Pedro Visca Children's Hospital in 1922, attached to the Dámaso Larrañaga Asylum, with pavilions for medicine and surgery, a polyclinic, laboratories and complementary facilities. In 1921, the Executive Power authorized the Public Assistance to invest $7,640 monthly in the organization of the early childhood protection service and the wet nurse office. The first aid service used to have a technical staff of 26 doctors and 16 interns. To care for street minors, by a decree of 1920 a section of the "Bóvedas" was designated for overnight accommodation of these minors, under the administration and surveillance of the Police. A second decree issued the following year, entrusted the National Women's Council with the patronage of that shelter and the administration of the "Quinta de Menores;" a new service for the same street minors. In 1920, the principle that the employer "who is in charge of the exploitation of industries or the performance of work of any kind, is civilly liable for all accidents that occur to his workers because of work or on the occasion of it," was incorporated into legislation. The legislator made a long list of jobs and industries in which this principle was applicable "and added that the Executive Power could expand the payroll." Domestic service was included in this reform. In the event of temporary disability, the worker would receive compensation equal to half of his salary, in the event of permanent partial disability a life annuity equal to half the reduction in salary, and in the event of absolute permanent disability a life annuity equal to two-thirds of the annual salary. In the event that the accident had caused death "the spouse would receive a life annuity of 20% of the salary and the minor children an annuity of 15% at 40% of annual salary depending on the number of children." In 1919, a Public Utilities Pension Fund was established covering water, telephone, street car, telegraph, railway and gas-company workers. This provided protection against unemployment, death, disability and old age. In 1922, coverage of the Public Utilities Pension Fund was extended to include employees in medical-aid societies and in shipbuilding and repairs. A decree of 14 May 1920 provided specific regulations of working conditions for maritime work, while a law of 13 July 1921 provided for special loans by the Mortgage Bank for the building of workers' houses. In 1921 over 100 houses were built by the government. A decree of 1922 required every employer or contractor of undertakings covered by labor laws "now in force to provide himself with all the documents provided by the national labor office within 10 days after beginning operations." Also, within three days after a declaration of a strike or lockout "the employer or contractor of the establishment must notify the national labor office." In addition, a decree of 16 February 1923 provided for the establishment "of training courses for the labor inspectors of Montevideo." On 24 October 1922 a decree was issued "amplifying the provisions in force in regard to tenders to the State for public works or material in order to put Uruguayan industry in a more favourable position for securing contracts than foreign industry," and also requiring that "there be included in the contracts made with the State clauses which may benefit the working classes." A law of 15 February 1923 fixed a minimum wage for laborers employed in agricultural or stock-raising work, while requiring employers to furnish the laborers "sanitary living quarters and sufficient food, or in lieu thereof to allow them an additional sum of 0.50 peso (51.7 cents, par) per day or 12 pesos ($12.41, par) per month, as the laborers may desire."

The rural minimum wage policy, which José Batlle y Ordóñez in 1919 proposed in the conferences of his party’s leaders that the party advocate a minimum wage for rural workers, proved a divisive one for the Colorados. As noted by one study, “From a three-to-one dominance of the lower house the majority declined to sixty-seven against fifty-six in 1917 and an actual minority of the votes cast in the election. In 1919 the ‘regular’ Deputies of Batlle’s party were in a minority in the Camara. Inability to arrive at a programme that would satisfy all branches of the party and to organize and maintain a strict party discipline enabled the opposition to keep the minimum wage bill in committee for about two years.”

President Brum also proposed to a Commission appointed by the National Council of Administration, as a tribute to the Centennial celebrations, a program of laws taken from the plan of the League of Nations. These were (1.) The work cannot be considered as a merchandise or article of commerce. (2.) The right of association. (3.) Payment of a salary that ensures workers the highest possible level. (4.) The workday of eight hours a day or 48 hours a week. (5.) The weekly rest of at least 24 hours. (6.) The abolition of child labor and the restriction of the work of young people of both sexes, in such a way that they can continue their education and ensure their physical development. (7.) The principle of equal pay without distinction between the sexes for work of equal value. (8.)The real and effective application of labor protection laws and regulations.

Many of these postulates, Brum said in his Message, had already been incorporated into legislation, for which Uruguay had deserved the praise of Lloyd George, Clemenceau and Wilson. But others were missing that were projected or that await legislative sanction.

A project was also presented by José Batlle y Ordóñez to the Batllista caucus and by it to the Legislative Body, which established that two-thirds established of the profits of the State industrial companies, whose services were mainly provided by workers, would be used to raise the salaries and wages of workers and employees "up to double at least the average of private services." Although it triumphed in the Chamber of Deputies, it was rejected by the Senate.

Historical and literary interests
Beyond the strictly political, Baltasar Brum was noted for interests in Uruguayan history and folklore. During his presidential term of office he took measures with a view to preserving and protecting the historic Fortaleza de Santa Teresa in the Rocha Department and after leaving office Brum collaborated in the preparation of related literature.

President Gabriel Terra's rule by decree and Brum's suicide
On 31 March 1933, on the installation of President Gabriel Terra's rule by decree, Brum attempted to lead resistance to Terra's government. After having increasingly realized during the course of that day that Terra's authoritarian rule enjoyed at least tacit support by many Uruguayans, Brum hurried into the middle of a road in Montevideo, was heard to shout viva la libertad! viva Batlle! (long live liberty! long live Batlle!), and committed suicide by gunshot. He was aged 49 at the time of his death.

To some observers, Brum represented a self-sacrificing romantic streak within Uruguayan politics at a time when many Uruguayans were prepared tacitly to accept extrajudicial changes brought in by Terra. To others, Brum's spectacular suicide suggested the presence of elements of mental instability, which, however, was not medically proven.

Family and heritage
His brother Alfeo Brum later served as Vice President of Uruguay.

Honours and awards

National honours 
 A town in Artigas Department is named after him.

Foreign honours 
:
  Grand Cross of the Order of the Tower and Sword (16 November 1922)

See also
 Politics of Uruguay
 List of political families § Uruguay
 Baltasar Brum, Artigas § History
 Fortaleza de Santa Teresa § Folklore and legends

References

External links
 Photo, showing Baltasar Brum on 31 March 1933, before he committed suicide later that day

1883 births
1933 suicides
Uruguayan people of Portuguese descent
People from Artigas Department
Colorado Party (Uruguay) politicians
Presidents of Uruguay
Education and Culture Ministers of Uruguay
Foreign ministers of Uruguay
Protest-related deaths
Uruguay in World War I
Prime Ministers of Uruguay
Suicides by firearm in Uruguay
Burials at the Central Cemetery of Montevideo
1933 deaths